Steve Sydenham is a former Australian professional rugby league player. A centre and winger, he played seven matches in the NSWRFL for South Sydney (1978–79) and the Eastern Suburbs (1980).

References

Year of birth missing (living people)
Living people
Australian rugby league players
South Sydney Rabbitohs players
Sydney Roosters players
Rugby league centres
Rugby league wingers